William Lacy Kenly (February 18, 1864 – January 10, 1928) was a major general in the United States Army. During World War I, he was a leader of the United States Army Air Service, the progenitor of the United States Air Force.

Early life 
William L. Kenly was born on February 18, 1864, in Baltimore, Maryland, the son of Major William L. Kenly and Marion Hook. His father participated in the American Civil War. His immigrant ancestor was his great great grandfather Rev. Daniel Kenly who emigrated from Scotland to Maryland in the 1700s. Kenly was married to Julie Closson, the daughter of Brigadier General Henry W. Closson.

Military career 
He was a graduate of the United States Military Academy at West Point, 12 June 1889, in field artillery and took part on August 16, 1899, in the Battle of Angeles, in the Pampanga Province during the Philippine–American War.

On September 3, 1917, Brigadier General Kenly became the first Chief of Air Service of the American Expeditionary Force (AEF) in France, effectively taking control away from the Aviation Section, U.S. Signal Corps. Previously a field artillery commander, he did not have experience leading an air force, and Billy Mitchell wielded a large amount of influence in the AEF's operational decisions. Kenly was replaced a short time later by Brig. Gen. Benjamin Foulois. 

 
Kenly then returned to the United States to become Director of Military Aeronautics from May 20, 1918, to August 28, 1918. During this period, he was the titular head of the newly established United States Army Air Service. He retired in 1919 and King George of Great Britain awarded Kenly the honor of Companion of the Order of the Bath.

Death
Kenly died of a heart attack on January 10, 1928, in Washington, D.C. He was buried at Arlington National Cemetery in Virginia.

References

External links

United States Army generals of World War I
United States Army generals
Military aviation leaders of World War I
United States Army Air Forces generals
1864 births
1928 deaths
Burials at Arlington National Cemetery
Recipients of the Distinguished Service Medal (US Army)
Recipients of the Silver Star
People from Baltimore
United States Military Academy alumni
Military personnel from Maryland
United States Army Field Artillery Branch personnel